Feuillets inédits ("unpublished pages") is a piece of music by Olivier Messiaen for piano and ondes Martenot. It is not known when the work was composed but it was put together by the composer's second wife Yvonne Loriod and published in 2001. The manuscript of the fourth part of the work was entitled "Déchiffrage" (deciphering).

References

Compositions for piano
Compositions by Olivier Messiaen
Year of song unknown